Dzhatva is a rural locality (a station) in Seletkansky Selsoviet of Shimanovsky District, Amur Oblast, Russia. The population was 4 as of 2018.

Geography 
It is located 25 km south-east from Shimanovsk, on the Bolshaya Pyora River.

References 

Rural localities in Shimanovsky District